The 1905 North Carolina A&M Aggies football team represented the North Carolina A&M Aggies of North Carolina College of Agriculture and Mechanic Arts during the 1905 college football season. in George S. Whitney's first and only season as head coach, the Aggies compiled a record of tied 4–1–1. They tied North Carolina, the third consecutive draw in the rivalry, and outscored their opponents 66 to 10 .

Schedule

References

North Carolina AandM
NC State Wolfpack football seasons
North Carolina AandM Aggies football